The Battles of Heraclea were a series of battles fought during the Crusade of 1101 between Crusaders led by William II, Count of Nevers and the Sultanate of Rum led by Kilij Arslan I. Both battles resulted in a Turkish victory.

The French that constituted the second group of the Crusade of 1101, could also escape wrath of Sultan Kilij Arslan I. William II, Count of Nevers who arrived in Istanbul in June 1101, moved fast to Ankara and then he moved to Konya the army suffered on the way Turkish raids. When they arrived the army were terrified by Turks, Kilij Arslan I attacked them which ended in a Turkish victory.

The French and German that headed east under the command of William II, Count of Nevers arrived at Istanbul early June 1101, where they headed Konya through Nicomedia-Nicaea entering Seljuk lands near Aksehir. As Kilij Arslan had heard of their marching long time ago, they evacuated cities, including Konya and destroyed the field and water sources. Kilij Arslan and Gazi Gümüshtigin waited for them to get weaker and weaker, they saw the Crusaders running to a river, Kilij Arslan attacked them and it ended in a Turkish victory.

References

Citations 

Heraclea 1101
Crusade of 1101